Events in the year 1739 in India.

Events
National income - ₹8,776 million
Nadir Shah invades India from Iran.
Nadir Shah captures and sacks Delhi.

References

 
India
Years of the 18th century in India